C. arenaria  may refer to:
 Carex arenaria, the sand sedge, a plant species
 Catinella arenaria, the sandbowl snail, a small air-breathing land snail species
 Cicindela arenaria, a ground beetle species native to the Palearctic Europe
 Croitana arenaria, the inland sand-skipper, a butterfly species endemic to the Northern Territory and South Australia

See also
 Arenaria (disambiguation)